Omanthai is a little town in North Sri Lankan district of Vavuniya. The last Sri Lankan army check point which divided the Government and LTTE controlled areas used to be in Omanthai for many years.

Education 
 Omanthai Central College

Transport 

Omanthai railway station is served by the Northern Line of the Sri Lanka Railways.  The town is temporarily the terminus of the line, while the track is being rebuilt to Jaffna and Kankesanturai. The railway station was one of the later stations to re-open after being closed during the civil war.

See also 
 Thandikulam–Omanthai offensive
 Operation Jayasikurui
 Railway stations in Sri Lanka
Pandarikulam

References 

 
Towns in Vavuniya District
Vavuniya DS Division